In Greek mythology, Epidaurus (Ancient Greek: Ἐπίδαυρος) was the presumed eponym of the polis Epidaurus.

His parentage varies from one local version of the myth to another: the Argive version gives him as the son of Argus (himself son of Zeus) and Evadne; people of Elis believed him to be a son of Pelops; finally, the Epidaurians themselves considered him to be a son of Apollo. These versions are recounted by Pausanias, who also adds that he knew of no natives of Epidaurus who would claim descent from the eponymous hero.

Notes

Children of Apollo
Princes in Greek mythology
Inachids
Mythology of Argos

References 

 Apollodorus, The Library with an English Translation by Sir James George Frazer, F.B.A., F.R.S. in 2 Volumes, Cambridge, MA, Harvard University Press; London, William Heinemann Ltd. 1921. ISBN 0-674-99135-4. Online version at the Perseus Digital Library. Greek text available from the same website.
 Pausanias, Description of Greece with an English Translation by W.H.S. Jones, Litt.D., and H.A. Ormerod, M.A., in 4 Volumes. Cambridge, MA, Harvard University Press; London, William Heinemann Ltd. 1918. . Online version at the Perseus Digital Library
 Pausanias, Graeciae Descriptio. 3 vols. Leipzig, Teubner. 1903.  Greek text available at the Perseus Digital Library.